Edna is an unincorporated community within Magoffin County, Kentucky, United States.

A post office was established at Edna in 1900 and named for the local Edna Patton Amyx.

References

Unincorporated communities in Magoffin County, Kentucky
Unincorporated communities in Kentucky